Liu Thai Ker (born 23 February 1938) is an architect and a former master planner of the Urban Redevelopment Authority of Singapore. Liu is Chairman of the Centre for Liveable Cities.

Early life and education
Liu was born on 23 February 1938 in Muar, Johor, the eldest son of Liu Kang, the pioneer Nanyang Style artist. His family moved to Singapore after the conclusion of World War II. He studied in Chung Cheng High School, where he skipped a grade due to academic excellence. After graduating, he worked as a substitute teacher at Kong Hwa School in order to save money for further studies. He had plans to go to China to study art, but his mother convinced him to study architecture instead.

With the assistance of a donation from the Lee Foundation, he enrolled in the University of New South Wales in 1962, where he graduated with a first-class honours degree in architecture, and was also awarded a medal for being the top student. He furthered his studies at Yale University in 1965 with a masters in urban planning, where he was again awarded a medal for being the top student in the faculty.

Career 
During his time in Yale, Liu formed close relationships with his professors. One them introduced Liu to I.M. Pei, who offered Liu a job at his firm. He also worked in Loder & Dunphy in Sydney.

Following Singapore's expulsion from Malaysia in 1965, Liu felt a desire to "change the fate of Singaporeans". He was approached by Teh Cheang Wan, the Chief Executive Officer of the Housing and Development Board (HDB), and offered a job at HDB as head of the Design and Research Unit.

In 1969, Liu returned to Singapore and joined HDB, eventually becoming its CEO in 1979. In 1989, he moved to the Urban Redevelopment Authority (URA) as its CEO and chief planner, where his contributions included the revision of its Concept Plan.

In 1992, Liu left public service to join RSP Architectures Planners and Engineers as a director. During this time, he designed Marina Bay Cruise Centre Singapore and the Chinese Cultural Centre. He also did city planning for more than fifty cities, among them Fuzhou. Fuzhou party secretary Xi Jinping, impressed by his city plan, also approached him to design Fuzhou Changle International Airport.

In December 2017, at the age of 79, Liu left RSP to found Morrow Architects and Planners, named after his father's artistic studio.

Awards and honors
Liu has been awarded: 
Public Administration Medal (Gold) 1976
Meritorious Service Medal 1985 
Singapore Institute of Architects Gold Medal 
Medal of the City of Paris, France (2001) 
Asean Achievement Award for Outstanding Contributions to Architecture (1993)
Honorary Doctorate, University of New South Wales

See also
Urban Redevelopment Authority
Economy of Singapore

References

Living people
Yale University alumni
University of New South Wales alumni
Singaporean architects
Singaporean urban planners
Singaporean people of Hokkien descent
Singaporean politicians of Chinese descent
Architects of Chinese descent
1938 births